Jogah (Drum Dancers) are the mythical "little people" in Iroquois lore. Usually invisible, there are ways of telling if they are around. For example, drumming with no visible drummers around. They also leave rings of bare earth and "bowls" in stones or mud; offerings like tobacco and fingernails can be offered at these "bowls." They are also used to explain disembodied lights and bad luck. Behaviorally, the Jogah love games and playing tricks, which can be dangerous if they are disrespected. They have been claimed to cause illness in homes and neighborhoods that are built on sites to which they are attracted.

The Jogah are divided into multiple groups. The Gahongas "stone throwers or rollers" live in rocky areas like streams. Their favorite game is to play "catch" with people using stones, often the size of boulders.  The Gandayah care for the flora of an area, telling it when to grow and how good its yield will be.  They are known to help respectful Iroquois farmers. They are also known to love strawberries and take the forms of American robins, if their news is good, or owls, if it is bad.  Lastly, the Ohdows are the subterranean guardians of our world.  They protect it from creatures of the underworld which would spread disease and, in the case of the "White Buffalo," chaos. The Ohdow come out of the underground at night to dance and hunt any underworld creatures that have escaped. To help with this task, fingernails were left as offerings as the animals knew what Ohdow smelled like and would hide from them.

General sources 
 Native Languages: Jagah. http://www.native-languages.org/morelegends/jogah.htm

References

Nature spirits
Iroquois legendary creatures